Andrei Aleksandrovich Viktorovich (born 28 January 1963) is a former Belarusian football player.

In 1996, he played one game for FC Luch Vladivostok as a field (non-goalkeeper) player.

References

1963 births
Footballers from Minsk
Living people
Soviet footballers
Belarusian footballers
Association football goalkeepers
FC Traktor Minsk players
FC Luch Vladivostok players
FC Irtysh Omsk players
Soviet Second League players
Russian Premier League players
Russian First League players
Russian Second League players
Belarusian expatriate footballers
Expatriate footballers in Russia
Belarusian expatriate sportspeople in Russia